The Old Methodist District Parsonage is a 19th-century Italianate residence in Romney, West Virginia, United States. It is a two-story brick dwelling constructed between 1868 and 1882 to serve as the district parsonage for the area's Methodist churches. After it fell out of use by the church, the eight-room residence was purchased and restored by the Long family and currently features 18th and 19th century furnishings and folk art. The Old Parsonage was listed on the National Register of Historic Places in 2005.

See also 
List of historic sites in Hampshire County, West Virginia
National Register of Historic Places listings in Hampshire County, West Virginia

References

External links

Buildings and structures in Romney, West Virginia
Houses completed in 1882
Houses in Hampshire County, West Virginia
Houses on the National Register of Historic Places in West Virginia
Italianate architecture in West Virginia
Methodism in West Virginia
National Register of Historic Places in Hampshire County, West Virginia
Clergy houses in the United States
1882 establishments in West Virginia